Jean Etcheberry (27 August 1901 – 5 February 1982) was a French rugby union player who competed in the 1924 Summer Olympics. He was born in Vieux-Boucau-les-Bains and died in Les Côtes-d'Arey, Isère. In 1924 he won the silver medal as member of the French team.

References

External links
Olympic database profile

1901 births
1982 deaths
Sportspeople from Landes (department)
French rugby union players
Olympic rugby union players of France
Rugby union players at the 1924 Summer Olympics
Olympic silver medalists for France
French-Basque people
France international rugby union players
Medalists at the 1924 Summer Olympics